Francis L. Marini is a Massachusetts politician and jurist who served as a judge in the Taunton District Court.  He retired from Hingham District Court in 2015

An attorney and town politician in Hanson, Massachusetts, Marini was elected to the Massachusetts House of Representatives in 1994. He served as Minority Whip from 1997 to 1999 and was the House Minority leader from 1999 to 2002.

Marini resigned from the House on November 19, 2002, in order to become a judge in the Taunton District Court.

References

1949 births
Suffolk University alumni
Suffolk University Law School alumni
Cornell University alumni
Massachusetts state court judges
Members of the Massachusetts House of Representatives
People from Hanson, Massachusetts
Politicians from Quincy, Massachusetts
Living people